Everton Pereira (born 21 August 1995), sometimes known as just Everton, is a Brazilian footballer who plays for Capital CF as a right back.

Club career
Born in Goiânia, Goiás, Everton Pereira finished his formation with Goiás. On 24 January 2015 he was promoted to the main squad by manager Wagner Lopes.

Everton Pereira made his Série A debut on 10 May, starting in a 0–0 away draw against Vasco.

References

External links
Everton at playmakerstats.com (English version of ogol.com.br and zerozero.pt)

1995 births
Living people
Sportspeople from Goiânia
Brazilian footballers
Association football defenders
Campeonato Brasileiro Série A players
Campeonato Brasileiro Série B players
Campeonato Brasileiro Série D players
Goiás Esporte Clube players
União Recreativa dos Trabalhadores players
Associação Atlética Aparecidense players
Clube Esportivo Aimoré players
Iporá Esporte Clube players
21st-century Brazilian people